Buckeye Elementary School District 33 is a school district in Buckeye, Maricopa County, Arizona, feeding into Buckeye Union High School District. The district consists of seven K–8 schools, with more than 5,200 students and 650 staff.

History
The first school in Buckeye was built in 1889. It was a one-room school made of lumber and located on the north side of Clanton Street between Fifth and Sixth streets. Just one year after it was built (1890), W. J. Melton organized a Baptist church group which met there on Sundays and for socials. The school outgrew the building and had to move, but the church remained there until 1931. In 1903, Buckeye built a four-room, two-story, red brick building with an outdoor stairway with a woodshed under the stairway. It was just east of the original school and across from the present elementary school (211. S. Seventh Street, Buckeye, AZ 85326.) There were two large rooms on the ground floor and two upstairs.

In 1937, the Buckeye Elementary School was constructed on its current location.

As the community of Buckeye grew, so did the school district:

 2004 - Bales Elementary School
 2005 - Sundance Elementary School
 2006 - WestPark Elementary School
 2007 - Jasinski Elementary School
 2008 - Inca Elementary School
 2017 - Marionneaux Elementary School
 2021 - John S. McCain III Elementary School

References

External links
 

School districts in Maricopa County, Arizona
1889 establishments in Arizona Territory
School districts established in 1889